3  is an American reality television series that premiered on July 26, 2012, on CBS in the United States. It revolved around three very different women who are brought together to search for love. They provided emotional support to each other as they deal with the realities of dating. The series was hosted by Alex Miranda. The format was based on a similar series that was made in Israel.

Broadcast
On July 31, 2012, CBS announced that the show had been pulled from the schedule effective immediately, following low ratings for its first two episodes.

On August 5, 2012, CBS began releasing new episodes online. '@3_CBS' on Twitter confirms that 3 is now an online series.

In the spring of 2013, VH1 Brasil reran the original "3" series in its entirety.

Other versions
On 3 May 2012, it was announced that a UK version would air on ITV2. This was presented by Emma Willis. The series, named Girlfriends, ran for 2 seasons in 2012 and 2013.

References

External links

2010s American reality television series
2012 American television series debuts
2012 American television series endings
American dating and relationship reality television series
American television series based on Israeli television series
CBS original programming
English-language television shows
Television series by Magical Elves